Constant Vincent Houlbert (18 July 1857 in Voutré en Mayenne – 22 December 1947 in Rennes) was a French entomologist who specialised in Lepidoptera and Coleoptera.

He was a conservator at the Museum in Rennes and later Professor in the School of Medicine and Pharmacy at the University of Rennes. He wrote with René Oberthür Lucanides de Java. Insecta; revue illustree d’Entomologie, Rennes (1912–1914), Tableaux génériques illustrés des Coléoptères de France.
Rennes (1912), various parts of  Faune entomologique armoricaine with Eugène Monnot and many other works.

References
Constantin, R. 1992 Memorial des Coléopteristes Français.  Bull. liaison Assoc. Col. reg. parisienne, Paris (Suppl. 14).
Lhoste, J. 1987 Les entomologistes français. 1750 - 1950. INRA (Institut National de la Recherche Agronomique), Paris.
Oberthür, C. 1916 [Houlbert, C. V.] Études Lép. Comp.
Gaedecke, R. and Groll, E. K. (Hrsg.): Biografien der Entomologen der Welt : Datenbank. Version 4.15 : Senckenberg Deutsches Entomologisches Institut, 2010 
Des Abbayes, H. 1947: [Houlbert, C. V.] Bull. Soc. Bretagne 12 (1/4)3-6
Jolivet 1948: [Houlbert, C. V.] Misc. Entomol., Narbonne 45 (10

French entomologists
1857 births
1947 deaths